Michael Patterson may refer to:
Michael Patterson (animator), American director and animator, creator of MC Skat Kat
Michael Patterson (English footballer) (1905 – after 1931)
Michael Patterson (Australian footballer) (1941–2002), AFL player
Michael Patterson (producer), American record producer and mixer
Michael Patterson, a character in For Better or For Worse

See also
Michael Paterson (disambiguation)
Mike Patterson (disambiguation)